Ethel M Botanical Cactus Garden is a  botanical garden located at the Ethel M Chocolate Factory in Henderson, Nevada. The garden, and the factory itself, are open to the public with no admission charge.   

The garden, like the factory, are named after Ethel G Mars, first wife of Frank C. Mars and mother of Forrest Mars Sr.

The Botanical Cactus Garden also include a "Living Machine", their name for a demonstration waste water treatment facility. Using bacteria, algae, protozoa, snails and fish, the facility recycles 100 percent of the chocolate factory's waste water without the use of any chemicals. The water is recycled for use in providing water for the garden.  The ponds from the waste water facility attract many of the birds that inhabit the garden.

The garden opened in September 1981. During the mid-1980s, average visitor attendance was 300 to 400 people per day. Throughout the year the Botanical Cactus Garden are host to several community events including the annual cactus garden lighting. The cactus garden holiday lights show is hosted in November and December and is free to the general public.

Collection 
The Garden contains more than 350 different cactus and succulent species. Over half are native to the American southwest; the remainder are from Australia and South America. The collection includes varieties such as:

 The giant saguaro (Carnegiea gigantea)
 Ocotillo (Fouquieria splendens)
 Prickly pears and chollas (Opuntia):
 Beavertail Cactus (Opuntia basilaris)
 Teddy bear cholla (Opuntia bigelovii)
 Bishop's Cap Cactus (Astrophytum myriostigma)
 Clumping hedgehogs (Echinocereus)
 Compass barrel cactus
 Fish hook barrels (Echinocactus wislizeni)
 Red barrel cactus (Ferocactus pilosus)
 Mesquite (Prosopis chilensis)
 Twisted acacia
 Desert willow (Chilopsis linearis)

See also 
 List of botanical gardens in the United States

References

External links 
Official Ethel M Cactus Garden web page

Botanical gardens in Nevada
Tourist attractions in the Las Vegas Valley
Protected areas of Clark County, Nevada
Cactus gardens
Mars, Incorporated